Christopher Walker (born 1964) is an English actor, known for his roles as  Matthew Mullen in the BBC drama Playing the Field and Rob Hollins in the BBC soap opera Doctors. For the portrayal of Rob, Walker has been nominated for various awards, and in 2010, he won the award for Best On-Screen Partnership at the British Soap Awards, alongside Jan Pearson who plays his on-screen wife, Karen Hollins.

Career
Walker's television debut was in the ITV crime drama The Bill, in the role of Nick Shaw, a role he played from 1985 to 1987. He later returned to the series in 2007, in a different role. In 1997, he appeared in the ITV soap opera Coronation Street from March to May playing Ray Thorpe, a decorator. A year later, Walker began appearing in the BBC drama series Playing the Field as main character Matthew Mullen. Then in 2001, he joined the cast of the BBC procedural drama Merseybeat as PC Larry 'Tiger' Barton, a role he portrayed until 2004. In December 2005, he returned to Coronation Street, playing reformed killer Ed Jackson until March 2006. In 2009, Walker began portraying the role of Rob Hollins in the BBC soap opera Doctors. In 2010, he won the award for Best On-Screen Partnership at the British Soap Awards, alongside Jan Pearson, who portrays his on-screen wife, Karen Hollins. Also in 2010, he participated as a contestant in Celebrity Masterchef, where he placed in the final five.

Personal life
Walker has a wife, Sharron, a son Gabriel, and a daughter, Anastasia, who is a member of the rock band Bang Bang Romeo. Since competing in Celebrity MasterChef, Walker became an amateur chef, and participated as a chef during the Doncaster Wool Market Show, as part of the 2019 Doncaster Food Festival. In addition, he has put on gourmet nights, including nine course meals at locations such as Regent Hotel.

Filmography

Awards and nominations

References

External links
 

1964 births
Actors from Wakefield
English male film actors
English male soap opera actors
Living people
People from South Elmsall